Billy White (1936–2000) was an English football player.

Billy White may also refer to:
 Billy White (basketball), American basketball player

See also
 Bill White (disambiguation)
 Willie White (disambiguation)